John McCaffrey (born 11 September 1987) is an Irish sportsperson.  He plays hurling with his local club Lucan Sarsfields and has been a member of the Dublin senior inter-county team since 2006.

Playing career

Club

McCaffrey plays his club hurling with the Lucan Sarsfield's club.  He won a county minor championship title with the club in 2005. He also played when the club played their first ever Senior Hurling championship county final in 2013.

Inter-county

McCaffrey first lined out for the Dublin hurlers at minor level (as well as representing Dublin in minor football).  He was captain of the team in 2005 as 'the Dubs' captured the Leinster title following a win over Wexford.

After success at minor level McCaffrey subsequently joined the Dublin under-21 team where he also served as captain.  He won a Leinster title in this grade in 2007 following a 2–18 to 3–9 defeat of Offaly.  Dublin later qualified for the All-Ireland final, however, the team was heavily defeated by Galway.

By this stage McCaffrey had already joined the Dublin senior hurling team, making his championship debut against Westmeath in 2006.  In 2009 Dublin qualified for their first Leinster final since 1991, however, Kilkenny were the winners by 2–18 to 0–18.

In 2011 McCaffrey took over as Dublin senior hurling team captain due to an injury sustained by regular captain Stephen Hiney. Dublin later qualified for their first National Hurling League final in sixty-five years. In the final they over came Kilkenny in the final by 0–22 to 1–07 to win a first league title since 1939.

In July 2013, McCaffrey became the first Dublin captain to lift the Bob O'Keeffe trophy as Dublin won the Leinster hurling final against Galway by 2–25 to 2–13.

Honours
Leinster Senior Hurling Championship (1): 2013
National Hurling League (1): 2011
National Hurling Division 1B (1): 2013
National Hurling Division 2 (1): 2006
Leinster Minor Hurling Championship (1): 2005
Leinster Under-21 Hurling Championship (1): 2007
Dublin Minor Hurling Championship (1): 2005

References

1987 births
Living people
Lucan Sarsfields hurlers
Dublin inter-county hurlers
People from Lucan, Dublin
Sportspeople from South Dublin (county)